The Rural Municipality of Indian Head No. 156 is a rural municipality (RM) in the Canadian province of Saskatchewan within Census Division No. 6 and  Division No. 1. It is located in the southeast portion of the province.

History 
The RM of Indian Head No. 156 incorporated as a rural municipality on August 6, 1884. The first settlers moved into the district in 1882.

Geography

Communities and localities 
The following urban municipalities are surrounded by the RM.

Towns
 Indian Head
 Sintaluta

Resort villages
 Katepwa (part)

Demographics 

Government 
The RM of Indian Head No. 156 is governed by an elected municipal council and an appointed administrator that meets on the second Tuesday of every month. The reeve of the RM is James Woidyla while its administrator is Tracy Luscombe. The RM's office is located in Indian Head.

References 

 
I
Division No. 6, Saskatchewan